Dollart was a  coaster that was built in 1912 by Stettiner Oderwerke AG, Stettin, Germany for German owners. She was seized by the Allies in May 1945, passed to the Ministry of War Transport (MoWT) and was renamed Empire Constancy. In 1947, she was sold into merchant service and renamed Polzeath. In 1951, she was sold to Turkey and renamed Meltem. Further sales saw her renamed Yener 9 in 1956 and Yarasli in 1959. She went missing in the Ionian Sea in January 1961.

Description
The ship was built in 1912 by Stettiner Oderwerke, Stettin.

The ship had a GRT of 535 and a NRT of 268.

The engine was built by Stettiner Oderwerke.

History
Dollart was built for Bugsier Reederei und Bergungs AG, Hamburg. Her port of registry was Hamburg, the Code Letters RSMN were allocated. In May 1919, Dollart transported a cargo of food and clothing from Germany to Scapa Flow, Orkney Islands to supply the crews of Kaiserliche Marine crews interned there. In 1933, her port of registry was changed to Bremerhaven. The following year, her Code Letters were changed to DHFJ.

In May 1945, Dollart was seized by the Allies at Copenhagen, Denmark. She was passed to the MoWT and renamed Empire Constancy. Her port of registry was changed to London and she was placed under the management of Rose Line Ltd. The Code Letters GFXT and United Kingdom Official Number 180639 were allocated. In 1947, Empire Constancy was sold to S Hannan & Co Ltd, Polzeath and was renamed Polzeath.

In 1951, Polzeath was sold to Azize Arkan v. Ortaklari, Turkey and was renamed Meltem. In 1956, she was sold to Erpak Vap Ithalkat Ihracat, Turkey and was renamed Yener 9. In 1959, she was sold to Zeki v Ziya Son Izzet Kirtil, Turkey and was renamed Yarasli. On 14 January 1961, Yarasli sailed from Istanbul bound for Bagnoli, Italy. On 25 January, she reported passing Kefalonia, Greece. Nothing further was heard of her and it is presumed she foundered in the Ionian Sea.

References

1912 ships
Ships built in Stettin
Steamships of Germany
Merchant ships of Germany
Maritime incidents in May 1914
World War I merchant ships of Germany
World War II merchant ships of Germany
Ministry of War Transport ships
Empire ships
Steamships of the United Kingdom
Merchant ships of the United Kingdom
Steamships of Turkey
Merchant ships of Turkey
Maritime incidents in 1961
Missing ships
Ships lost with all hands